Lhatŝ’aŝʔin (also known as Klatsassan or Klattasine; died 1864), a chief of the Chilcotin (Tsilhqot'in) people, led a small group of warriors in attacks on road-building crews near Bute Inlet, British Columbia, in April and May 1864. The road crews had been starving and underpaying Tsilhqot'in workers, which provoked Lhatŝ’aŝʔin to declare war. On 29 April 1864, Lhatŝ’aŝʔin arrived at a ferry site  up the Homathko River. He and his warriors killed ferry-keeper Tim Smith, plundering the food and stores kept there.  

The next day, Lhatŝ’aŝʔin attacked the unsuspecting and unarmed road workers at the main camp, killing 9. Further up the trail, the band came upon foreman William Brewster and three of his men. All were killed, Brewster's body being mutilated and left while the other three were thrown in the river. The band also killed William Manning, a settler at Puntzi Lake. Proceeding into the interior to escape justice, Lhatŝ’aŝʔin and his followers ambushed a pack-train led by Alexander McDonald; three more white workers were killed. In all, 19 white settlers were killed by Lhatŝ’aŝʔin and followers.

Lhatŝ’aŝʔin and his followers were captured on August 11, 1864 under false pretenses of peace parley to end the Chilcotin War. They were shackled and tried as murderers, and were hanged at Quesnellemouth (Quesnel, B.C.) on October 26, 1864. Lhatŝ’aŝʔin and his fellow war chiefs were exonerated for any crime or wrongdoing on October 23, 2014, by British Columbia Premier Christy Clark.

See also 
 Chilcotin War
 William George Cox
 Frederick Seymour
 Chartres Brew
 Donald McLean
 Alfred Waddington
 Fort Chilcotin
 Nicola (chief)
 Chief Hunter Jack

References

External links 
We Do Not Know His Name - Klatsassin & The Chilcotin War - Great Unsolved Mysteries in Canadian History

Year of birth missing
1864 deaths
19th-century First Nations people
19th-century Canadian criminals
Canadian spree killers
Chilcotin Country
Executed Canadian people
Executed spree killers
Indigenous leaders in British Columbia
People executed for murder
People executed by British North America by hanging
People executed by the Colony of British Columbia (1858–1866)
Pre-Confederation British Columbia people
Tsilhqot'in
People executed by Canada by hanging
1864 murders in Canada